Pharis and Jason Romero are a Canadian folk music duo, most noted as three-time Juno Award winners for Traditional Roots Album of the Year. They won the award at the Juno Awards of 2021 for their album Bet On Love, the Juno Awards of 2016 for their album A Wanderer I'll Stay, and at the Juno Awards of 2018 for Sweet Old Religion.

A husband and wife duo from Horsefly, British Columbia, they write, record and perform folk music. They also build handcrafted banjos under the business name J. Romero Banjos.

History
The pair met at an old-time fiddle jam and later married. They have released five albums as a duo, one with the short-lived project Haints Oldtime String Band, and one collaborative album with guest fiddlers. Their duo records, and live band shows, have included guest musicians John Reischman, Marc Jenkins, Patrick Metzger, and others.

Pharis and Jason have performed and taught across Canada, the US and Europe, often touring with their two children. Performance highlights include Celtic Connections in Scotland, two appearances on A Prairie Home Companion, and a tour with Stuart MacLean's The Vinyl Cafe.

Their first record, A Passing Glimpse, won a Canadian Folk Music Award for New/Emerging Artist of the Year at the 8th Canadian Folk Music Awards in 2012.

Long Gone Out West Blues was a shortlisted nominee for Traditional Album of the Year, and Pharis Romero won the award for Traditional Singer of the Year at the 9th Canadian Folk Music Awards in 2013.

A Wanderer I'll Stay was recorded at the couple's banjo workshop, in Horsefly, BC, with engineer David Travers-Smith. At the 11th Canadian Folk Music Awards in 2015 they garnered four nominations for Wanderer, including Traditional Album of the Year, Traditional Singer of the Year, Vocal Group of the Year and Producer of the Year. They won the Juno Award for Traditional Roots Album of the Year at the 2016 Juno Awards, and Songwriter of the Year at the 2016 Western Canadian Music Awards.

In 2016 the couple's workshop caught fire, destroying the entire banjo business and many of their musical instruments. The workshop was rebuilt, and used as a studio for the recording of their 2018 album, Sweet Old Religion, and 2020 album, Bet On Love. Both combine folk, blues and country.

Sweet Old Religion, released in 2018, received two Canadian Folk Music Awards at the 14th Canadian Folk Music Awards, for Vocal Group and Traditional Singer of the Year, and won the Juno Award for Traditional Roots Album of the Year at the Juno Awards of 2019.

Bet On Love, released in 2020, received three Canadian Folk Music Awards at the 16th Canadian Folk Music Awards, for Vocal Group, Ensemble and Traditional Singer of the Year, and won the Juno Award for Traditional Roots Album of the Year at the Juno Awards of 2021.

Discography
Shout Monah (2009, with Haints Oldtime String Band)
Back Up and Push (2010, as Jason & Pharis Romero and Friends)
A Passing Glimpse (2011)
Long Gone Out West Blues (2013)
A Wanderer I'll Stay (2015)
Sweet Old Religion (2018)
Bet on Love (2020)
Tell ’em You Were Gold (2022)

References

External links

Canadian bluegrass music groups
Canadian musical duos
Musical groups from British Columbia
Romero
Juno Award for Traditional Roots Album of the Year winners
Canadian Folk Music Award winners